William Cockburn (born 1889) was an English footballer who played as a defender for Liverpool in The Football League. Cockburn started his career at Rosehill before he moved to Stockport County F.C. He signed for Liverpool in 1924 and appeared 18 times during his debut season. He became a regular in the team the following season as he cemented a place in the Liverpool defence and only missed six of the 42 league matches during the season. He only appeared 9 times the following season and he was transferred to Queens Park Rangers F.C. in 1928.

References

1889 births
Year of death missing
English footballers
Liverpool F.C. players
Queens Park Rangers F.C. players
Stockport County F.C. players
English Football League players
Association football defenders